The 2009 Mountain West Conference baseball tournament took place from May 19 through 23. The top six regular season finishers of the league's seven teams met in the double-elimination tournament held at Texas Christian University's Lupton Stadium. Sixth seeded Utah won their first and only Mountain West Conference Baseball Championship with a championship game score of 9–3 and earned the conference's automatic bid to the 2009 NCAA Division I baseball tournament. Utah joined the Pac-12 Conference after the 2011 season without winning another title.

Seeding 
The top six finishers from the regular season were seeded one through six based on conference winning percentage only. Only six teams participate, so Air Force was not in the field.

Results

All-Tournament Team

Most Valuable Player 
Tyler Yagi, an outfielder for the champion Utah Utes, was named the tournament Most Valuable Player.

References 

Tournament
Mountain West Conference baseball tournament
Mountain West Conference baseball tournament
Mountain West Conference baseball tournament
Baseball in the Dallas–Fort Worth metroplex
Sports competitions in Fort Worth, Texas